The Forest King was a giant sequoia tree located in Nelder Grove, California that was cut down in 1870 and taken on a touring exhibit in the United States. This tree was the first of its kind to be felled for exhibition, unlike earlier trees such as the Mother of the Forest from Calaveras Grove where only bark was removed. This act sparked public outcry and would lead to the founding of national parks and the protection of giant sequoias through the nascent conservation movement.

Two men from Mariposa County, William Sneidiker and William Stegman, illegally cut down the tree and put it on the road. They hoped to take advantage of the public's interest in the discovery of California big trees before photography was widely available to document their existence.

The tree was first shown in Stockton, California before touring major cities such as Chicago, Cincinnati, and New York City by rail. In 1870, P.T. Barnum, the renowned showman, acquired the tree and added it to his New York attraction. In 1874, Barnum gifted the tree to Frank Leslie, a publisher and journalist, who installed it on his property, Interlaken, in Saratoga Springs, New York. Leslie built a platform and added a roof over the tree's hollow trunk, creating the Big Tree Pavilion. The Forest King stump was rediscovered in 2003.

History

First Encounter with P.T. Barnum 
In April 1870, William Stegman stumbled upon the Nelder Grove and returned with a 29.5-inch thick piece of giant sequoia bark, which was put on display at the Capitol Saloon in Mariposa. P.T. Barnum, who was visiting Mariposa to tour Yosemite Valley and the Mariposa Groves of giant sequoia in May, was taken by the bark and bought it from Stegman. Barnum paid $100, a fantastic sum in 1870 dollars.

Barnum considered cutting down a giant sequoia and taking it on tour across the nation. However, after consulting with engineers, Barnum quickly realized that the logistical and financial hurdles were too great to overcome. The task of transporting a hundred feet of one of these massive trees, weighing in at a staggering 200 tons, would take a full 240 days to transport from the mountain grove to navigable waters in the San Joaquín Valley. From there, it could be carried to San Francisco by barge, and then transported by clipper ship to New York, at a cost of around $100,000.

Instead of a whole tree, Barnum settled for the sequoia bark, which he shipped to San Francisco and exhibited at the Cosmopolitan Hotel for the summer. It then made its way to New York, where it was displayed at Barnum's American Museum.

Felling and Sectioning 

Barnum's interest in giant sequoias and his willingness to pay $100 for a section of bark sparked an illegal plan in the mind of Stegman and his business partner, William Sneidker. The two men devised a scheme to cut down a giant sequoia in Nelder Grove, a less-visited area south of the protected Mariposa Grove. Their goal was to create an exhibition tree using a smaller, sectioned portion of the tree that could be transported by ox cart and rail at a cheaper cost than P.T. Barnum's plan of moving a large, solid log.

The selected tree, standing at 260 feet tall with a diameter of 24 feet and a circumference of 75 feet, proved to be a formidable task to cut down. The group dug away the earth and cut the roots before using a 25-foot saw to saw the trunk in two, 30 inches above the roots. To transport the tree, they cut a twelve-foot section of the trunk and removed the heartwood with the help of blasting powder. The remaining circumference of the tree, including six inches of wood and several feet of thick bark, was cut into numbered sections for easy reassembly for display. The task was labor-intensive, taking three men five and a half days to dig down the trunk and 30 days to saw and split out the section. The tree left Nelder Grove on Tuesday, September 18th and was transported 150 miles to Stockton using 14 yoke of oxen and five wagons.

Travel and Exhibition 
The debut exhibition of the "Forest King," a giant sequoia tree, was held in Stockton, California in a tent on a vacant lot at the corner of Main and San Joaquin Streets. The tree's historically recognized name was given to it by coverage of the exhibit in the Daily San Joaquin Republican. Admittance to see the tree was 25 cents each. Schoolchildren were admitted for free.

The tree's origins were intentionally misrepresented by Stegman and Sneidker as coming from the more well-known Mariposa Grove. The tree was also falsely advertised as being 360 feet in height, 100 feet taller than the recorded height in the grove.

After the Stockton exhibit concluded, Stegman and Sneidker sold the tree to Samuel A. Pearson of San Francisco and Samuel Miller of Stockton, and returned to ranching in Hornitos, near Mariposa. The tree then traveled by intercontinental railroad with its new owners on a tour across the country, displaying it in Chicago, Cincinnati, and New York City. The "Forest King" was on display in Arcade Hall in Chicago for four weeks during the Christmas season, and was exhibited in Cincinnati at Wiswell's Art Gallery. In New York, the tree was displayed at 59th street and 5th avenue plaza near the entrance to Central Park.

P.T. Barnum in New York 

In November 1871, the Forest King was acquired by none other than P.T. Barnum, the legendary showman who had purchased the slab of giant sequoia bark the year earlier from Stegman in the Mariposa saloon. 
Barnum moved the Forest King exhibit several blocks to the Empire Rink where it was featured as part of his winter season, beginning November 13, 1871. The venue was renamed Barnum’s Museum, Menagerie, Hippodrome, Circus and International Zoological Gardens. In typical Barnum fashion, he exaggerated the tree’s age from 837 years to 1,937 years old. The Forest King was displayed alongside the 31-inch thick bark specimen that had been purchased the year before from William Stegman in Mariposa.

In 1874, Barnum gifted the exhibit to Frank Leslie, a publisher and journalist known for his illustrated newspapers and magazines. Leslie, in turn, installed the Forest King at his property, Interlaken, located in Saratoga Springs, New York. To showcase the tree on his estate, Leslie built a platform for it and erected a roof over its hollow trunk. The exhibit was fittingly renamed the Big Tree Pavilion and quickly became a popular attraction for visitors to Saratoga Springs.

While giant sequoia lumber can last for centuries, the remains of the Forest King exhibit are presumed lost to history. Meanwhile, in Nelder Grove, the stump was rediscovered in 2003 and confirmed based on site photographs made of its felling in 1870.

Legacy
In 1870, rumors of the plan to cut down a giant sequoia tree for exhibition by Snediker and Stegman sparked widespread outrage in central California. Newspaper publishers decried the plan and called for elected officials to take steps to preserve the groves intact. This reaction to the plan helped to coalesce into the conservation movement, with many arguing that the giant trees should be preserved as a source of health and pleasure for future generations.

The protection of giant sequoia trees in California was limited at the time, with only a few groves receiving federal protection. The Mariposa Grove in Yosemite National Park was one of the few to receive such protection, being recognized as part of the Yosemite Grant in 1964. However, most giant sequoia groves received no protection from state or federal authorities.

In March 1874, California Governor Newton Booth signed the first law to protect giant sequoia under penalty of fines, however, this legislation was limited in scope, only applying to trees over sixteen feet in diameter in the counties of Fresno, Tulare, and Kern. Despite the law, which remains on the books today, it was not an effective deterrent. Thousands of giant sequoias were felled across the state in places like Nelder Grove and Converse Basin through the end of the 19th century.

Dimensions

Bibliography
 Kruska, Dennis G. (1985). Sierra Nevada Big Trees: History of the Exhibitions, 1850-1903: Los Angeles, California: Dawson's Book Shop.
 Lowe, Gary D. (2004). The Big Tree Exhibits of 1870-1871 and the Roots of the Giant Sequoia Preservation Movement. Livermore, California: Lowebros Publishing.

References 

Sequoia (genus)
Trees
Individual giant sequoia trees
1870s individual tree deaths
History of the Sierra Nevada (United States)
Oldest trees